Ciutat de Barcelona Trophy is a summer tournament organized by RCD Espanyol in Barcelona. Initially there used to be four participating teams, but in more recent times it was a two-team tournament. Teams are usually club-level, but in 1981 the Honduras national football team participated, and finished last in the tournament. The 1980 final is the only one in which Espanyol did not play, while in 2009 the match was officially advertised as the opening of the new RCDE Stadium rather than the Ciutat event. The current holders of the trophy are the hosts Espanyol after a 1–1 (5–4 p) victory against Betis. The fixture has not been played since 2015, with no explanation given for its de facto discontinuation.

Titles
Note that only the winner and the runner-up are shown here. From 1974 to 1982 four teams participated in the competition, while a three-team edition was played in 1995.

Performance by club

Notes and references

RCD Espanyol
Barcelona, Ciutat